Paul University, Awka (PUA) is located in Awka, Anambra State in Nigeria. It is a private Christian University. It was founded in 2009 by Bishops of the five ecclesiastical provinces of the Anglican Church East of the Niger to provide undergraduate training in Arts, Natural and Applied Sciences, Social Sciences and Management.  The university which is fully residential has an estimated enrollment of around 400 students (expected to reach 3,500) and has replaced St Paul's University College which was founded in 1904 by the Church Missionary Society of the Church of England to train church workers and teachers. Although, Paul University Awka is a Private University, the Anambra State government under Governor Peter Obi donated cash and vehicles for its infrastructural upgrade and development.

Paul University has affiliate institutions like Institute of Theology which is headed by the Director, Ven Dr Rex Kanu.

The first Board of Trustee was headed by a former Vice President of Nigeria, Dr Alex Ekwueme (GCON) who also built the Administrative Offices which houses the Senate Chamber.

Academic Programmes 
Paul University, Awka currently has three faculties and these faculties offer a variety of courses. The faculties are; Faculty of Natural and Applied Sciences, Faculty of Management and Social Sciences, and Faculty of Arts. In addition, it runs an Institute of Theology, which it inherited from the defunct St. Paul's University College, and also admits students into the JUPEB and Continuing Education Programme (CEP).

The school provides the services of a bookshop, cyber cafe, computer Science and training center, among other services.

The list of courses offered and their duration, and degree awarded are listed below, by faculties.

Faculty of Natural and Applied Sciences

Faculty of Management and Social Sciences

Faculty of Arts

Library 
Paul University Library was established on 30 November 2009 to support and facilitate the teaching, learning, research and recreational activities of the University Community. The library inherited the collection of the former St. Paul's College, Awka, which is expanding and broadening as the College Library transforms into a University Library, balancing Sciences with earlier emphasis on the Arts, Social and Management Sciences.

The University Library also has an E-Library section. This is a section of the library in which the collections are stored in electronic media formats (as opposed to print, or other media) and accessible through computers. These are made available and accessible to the students and staff of the academic community.

References

  2.student/Ngoka Sunday of economics department 2014
    3.www.pauluniversity.edu.ng

Christian universities and colleges in Nigeria
Education in Anambra State
Educational institutions established in 2009
2009 establishments in Nigeria
Paul University alumni